Thomas James Clary (August 31, 1899 – August 1, 1977) was a United States district judge of the United States District Court for the Eastern District of Pennsylvania.

Education and career

Born in Seneca Falls, New York, Clary received an Artium Baccalaureus degree from Cornell University in 1920 and a Bachelor of Laws from Georgetown Law in 1924. He was in private practice in Philadelphia, Pennsylvania from 1924 to 1949.

Federal judicial service

Clary received a recess appointment from President Harry S. Truman on October 21, 1949, to the United States District Court for the Eastern District of Pennsylvania, to a new seat authorized by 63 Stat. 493. He was nominated to the same position by President Truman on January 5, 1950. He was confirmed by the United States Senate on March 8, 1950, and received his commission on March 9, 1950. He served as Chief Judge from 1961 to 1969. He was a member of the Judicial Conference of the United States from 1966 to 1968. He assumed senior status on March 1, 1969. His service terminated on August 1, 1977, due to his death in Philadelphia.

References

Sources
 

1899 births
1977 deaths
Cornell University alumni
Georgetown University Law Center alumni
Judges of the United States District Court for the Eastern District of Pennsylvania
United States district court judges appointed by Harry S. Truman
20th-century American judges
People from Seneca Falls, New York